Viktor Leonidovich Demyanenko (born August 26, 1958 in Alma-Ata, Kazakh SSR) is a retired boxer, who represented the USSR at the 1980 Summer Olympics in Moscow, Soviet Union. There he won the silver medal in the lightweight division (– 60 kg), after being defeated in the final by Cuba's Ángel Herrera. Demyanenko trained at Dynamo in Alma-Ata. He won gold at the 1979 European Championship. During his career Demyanenko won 267 fights out of 290.

1980 Olympic results 
Below is the record of Viktor Demyanenko, a lightweight boxer from the Soviet Union who competed at the 1980 Moscow Olympics:

 Round of 32: Defeated Mohamed Bangura (Sierra Leone) by disqualification in second round
 Round of 16: Defeated Jong Jo-Ung (North Korea) by decision, 5-0
 Quarterfinal: Defeated Yordan Lessov (Bulgaria) by decision, 5-0
 Semifinal: Defeated Richard Nowakowski (East Germany) referee stopped contest in first round
 Final: Lost to Ángel Herrera (Cuba) referee stopped contest in third round due to injury (was awarded silver medal)

References

 
 

1958 births
Living people
Sportspeople from Almaty
Soviet male boxers
Lightweight boxers
Boxers at the 1980 Summer Olympics
Olympic boxers of the Soviet Union
Dynamo sports society athletes
Olympic silver medalists for the Soviet Union
Olympic medalists in boxing
Kazakhstani male boxers
Honoured Masters of Sport of the USSR
Medalists at the 1980 Summer Olympics